Stepan Karapetovich Pogosyan (Poghosyan) (February 10, 1932 in Agakchi, Talin region, Armenia – May 17, 2012) was an Armenian historian and politician, a communist and social-democrat activist.

He studied at Yerevan State University. Then he ruled the state tele-radio-industry in Soviet Armenia for many years. From November, 1990 to May, 1991 he was the First Secretary of the Communist Party of Armenia, a member of Soviet Union Communist Party Central Committee (1990–91).

Poghosyan was a Doctor of historical sciences, Professor. He was an author of a number of books. He was also one of the leading members of Democratic Party of Armenia.

References

External links
 Biography (in Armenian)

1932 births
2012 deaths
People from Aragatsotn Province
Party leaders of the Soviet Union
Yerevan State University alumni
Politburo of the Central Committee of the Communist Party of the Soviet Union members
First Secretaries of the Armenian Communist Party
Democratic Party of Armenia politicians
Recipients of the Order of the Red Banner of Labour